The Institut National des Sciences Appliquées de Euro-Méditerranée or INSA Euro-Méditerranée is an engineering school in Morocco. This school is one of the public engineering institutes that make up the INSA's network and also part of Euromed University of Fez.

Academics 
INSA Euro-Méditerranée is one of several engineering schools within the Institut National des Sciences Appliquées (INSA) network under the supervision of the Ministry of the Economy and Finance (France) (. Although INSA engineering schools are selective and can be more expensive than public universities in France, these institutes typically have much smaller class sizes and student bodies, and many of their programs are taught in English. Degrees from INSA are awarded by the Ministry of National Education (France).

INSA Campuses

France 
INSA Lyon
INSA Rennes
INSA Rouen
INSA Strasbourg
INSA Toulouse
INSA Centre Val de Loire
INSA Hauts-de-France

Morocco 
INSA Euro-Méditerranée

References 

Educational institutions established in 2014